BPH may refer to:
 Bachelor of Philosophy, an undergraduate or postgraduate degree
 Bank BPH, a financial institution in Poland
Behaviour and Personality Assessment in Dogs, a Swedish temperament test for dogs
 Benign prostatic hyperplasia, an increase in size of the prostate in middle-aged and elderly men
 BoybandPH, a Filipino boy band
 Break Permitted Here, a control character in the C1 control code set
 Brown planthopper, a small insect that feeds on rice plants
 Rice genes giving resistance against the insects, including: Bph2, Bph6, Bph9, Bph14, and Bph18
 Burns Philp, a former food manufacturing business in Australia